SWAT Elite Troops is the second game of the Police Quest series to be released for mobiles. It was released March 1, 2008.

References 

2008 video games
Mobile games
Police Quest and SWAT
Shoot 'em ups
Video games about police officers
Video games developed in Finland